The Supreme Court of the Commonwealth of the Northern Mariana Islands, 1 CMC § 3101, is the highest court of the United States Commonwealth of the Northern Mariana Islands (CNMI), exercising civil and criminal appellate jurisdiction over commonwealth law matters. It should not be confused with the District Court for the Northern Mariana Islands, which exercises jurisdiction over federal law. The Supreme Court sits in the capital, Saipan, and consists of a Chief Justice and two Associate Justices. The CNMI has no intermediate appellate commonwealth law court, which means that the CNMI Supreme Court hears appeals directly from the trial-level Superior Court.


History
The Supreme Court was created by commonwealth law on May 1, 1989. This was allowed under the terms of the Covenant to Establish a Commonwealth of the Northern Mariana Islands in Political Union with the United States of America (“Covenant”), § 402(c), Act of Mar. 24, 1976, Pub. L. 94-241, 90 Stat. 263, codified as amended at 48 U.S.C. § 1801 note.  The Covenant granted self-government to the CNMI, with the U.S. administering the islands under the former United Nations Trust Territory of the Pacific Islands system.

Prior to the creation of the Supreme Court, the Covenant provided that the District Court for the NMI would exercise original jurisdiction over federal law matters and appellate jurisdiction over commonwealth law matters. Covenant § 402(a) & (c). With the creation of the Supreme Court, the District Court's appellate jurisdiction was effectively eliminated. However, the Covenant provided that for 15 years following the creation of a commonwealth appellate court, appeals of that court's decisions would go to the United States Court of Appeals for the Ninth Circuit, just as if the decision was rendered by the District Court.  Covenant § 403(a).  As of May 1, 2004, CNMI Supreme Court appeals can be taken directly to the United States Supreme Court, thus giving the CNMI court relative parity with the highest courts of the 50 U.S. states.

List of Chief Justices

 1989–1995 Jose Santos Dela Cruz – first Chief Justice and former trial judge
 1995–1998 Marty Wayne Kendall Taylor – Canadian-born California deputy district attorney and CNMI trial judge
 1999–2011 Miguel Sablan Demapan
 2011–2012 Alexandro Cruz Castro (Acting)
 2012–present Alexandro Cruz Castro

List of Associate Justices

 1989–1993 Jesus Camacho Borja
 1989–1997 Ramon Garrido Villagomez
 1993–1997 Pedro Mangloña Atalig
 1998–2012 Alexandro Cruz Castro
 1998–1999 Miguel Sablan Demapan
 2000–present John Atalig Mangloña
 2013–present Perry Borja Inos

See also
 Politics of the Northern Mariana Islands

References

External links
 Official homepage of the Commonwealth of the Northern Mariana Islands Judiciary 
 Commonwealth Law Revision Commission (with text of the Covenant)
 CNMI Bar Association
 

 
Northern Mariana Islands
Supreme Court
Northern Mariana Islands law
1980s establishments in the Northern Mariana Islands
Courts and tribunals established in 1989